The Cvetković Cabinet was elected on 7 July 2008 by a majority vote in the National Assembly. The coalition government was composed of the For a European Serbia alliance, the SPS-PUPS-JS, and ethnic minority parties. The Cabinet was reshuffled on 14 March 2011.

2008–2011

2011–2012 Cabinet reshuffle

See also
Cabinet of Serbia (2000–01)
Cabinet of Serbia (2001–04)
Cabinet of Serbia (2004–07)
Cabinet of Serbia (2007–08)
Cabinet of Serbia (2012–14)
Cabinet of Serbia

References

External links

Serbia
2008 establishments in Serbia
2012 disestablishments in Serbia
Cabinets established in 2008
Cabinets disestablished in 2012